Strensall with Towthorpe is a civil parish in the unitary authority area of the City of York in North Yorkshire, England. According to the 2011 census, it had a population of 6,047.

History 
Both Strensall and Towthorpe were historically part of the North Riding of Yorkshire until 1974. They were then a part of the district of Ryedale in North Yorkshire from 1974 until 1996. Since 1996, they have been part of the City of York unitary authority. On 1 April 2009 the parishes of "Strensall" and "Towthorpe" were abolished to form "Strensall with Towthorpe".

References

Civil parishes in North Yorkshire
Geography of York